The 1978 NSL Cup was the second season of the NSL Cup, which was the main national association football knockout cup competition in Australia. All 14 NSL teams from around Australia entered the competition, as well as a further 18 from various state leagues around Australia.

Teams
The NSL Cup was a knockout competition with 32 teams taking part all trying to reach the Final in October 1978. The competition consisted of the 14 teams from the National Soccer League plus 18 teams from their respective top division state leagues.

First round

Second round

Quarter-finals

Semi-finals

Final

Top scorers

References

NSL Cup
1978 in Australian soccer
NSL Cup seasons